Youssef Akdim (Berber: ⵢⵓⵙⴻⴼ ⴰⵇⴷⵉⵎ, ; born 4 July 1985), better known as Lartiste, is a French-Moroccan singer and rapper. Born in Imintanoute, Morocco, he emigrated to France at 7 years old, having lived in Bondy and later in Le Blanc-Mesnil, outside of Paris. At age 13, he became part of the rap band Malédiction and at 16 he adopted the stage name Lartiste ("L'artiste" - "The artist" in English).

He released "Évasion", his first maxi solo, in 2006 and joined the collective French Cut, having released a mixtape, Rap 1.9, in 2010. Going solo, his 2013 studio album, Lalbum ( l'album - "the album" in English), included several musical influences including funk, soul, pop, electro and African sounds. He released his second studio album, Fenomeno, in 2015, his third and fourth albums, Maestro and Clandestino, in 2016, and his fifth Clandestino, in 2018. Also in 2018, the third single from Clandestino, "Mafiosa", which features Brazilian singer Caroliina, reached number 2 in the main French singles chart, number one in the Megafusion chart (which contabilizes the selling and streaming numbers in France), number six in Wallonia and number one in Portugal, where it was also the first radio hit containing a significant part of lyrics in French since Stromae's "Papaoutai", in 2014.

Discography

 Lalbum (2013)
 Fenomeno (2015)
 Maestro (2016)
 Clandestino (2016)
 Grandestino (2018)
 Quartier Latin Vol.1 (2019)

References

External links
Facebook

1985 births
Living people
French male singers
French rappers
Moroccan rappers
French songwriters
Male songwriters
People from Marrakesh
French people of Shilha descent